The 1930–31 NHL season was the 14th season of the National Hockey League. Ten teams played 44 games each. The Montreal Canadiens beat the Chicago Black Hawks three games to two in the best-of-five Stanley Cup Finals for their second consecutive Stanley Cup victory.

League business

Art Ross bitterly complained about the Stanley Cup final setup. His team had been vanquished in two consecutive games by the Montreal Canadiens in 1929–30. As a result, the Board of Governors decided to make the final a best-of-five series.

The Great Depression was starting to take its toll on the NHL. In attempts to solve financial problems, the Pittsburgh Pirates moved to Philadelphia and became the Philadelphia Quakers, but there was nothing about the team to win games or fans. It was intended that the team stay in Philadelphia only until a new arena was built in Pittsburgh. The arena was never built, and the team folded after only one season in the new city. The state of Pennsylvania would be without an NHL team until the league doubled in size 36 years later.

The Ottawa Senators were in a similar financial boat but instead of relocating, they sold a star asset and future Hall of Famer, King Clancy, to the Toronto Maple Leafs for $35,000 and two players. Even after the sale of Clancy, the Senators' owners put the team up for sale for $200,000, although no bids approached anywhere near that figure. The team would suspend operations before the start of the next season.

The Detroit Cougars changed the team name to the Detroit Falcons.

The Canadian Amateur Hockey Association (CAHA) sent W. A. Fry and W. A. Hewitt to the 1930 NHL general meeting to seek a better working agreement. The CAHA suggested that players remain as amateurs for one season after graduating from junior ice hockey, and in return the CAHA would permit its amateurs to tryout and practice with professional teams. Hewitt subsequently met multiple times with NHL president Frank Calder, who saw merit in Hewitt's request to keep players in amateur hockey, and continued to discuss having a professional-amateur agreement.

Regular season
Howie Morenz led the league in scoring.

Dick Irvin started his career in coaching with Chicago and they finished second in the American Division. He resigned at season's end after having taken the Black Hawks to the finals.

Final standings

GP = Games Played, W = Wins, L = Losses, T = Ties, Pts = Points, GF = Goals For, GA = Goals Against

Teams that qualified for the playoffs are highlighted in bold.

Playoffs
On March 26, during the second game of the best-of-five series between the Bruins and Canadiens, coach-GM Art Ross of Boston pulled his goalie for an extra attacker while down 1–0 with 40 seconds left in the final period. The attempt was unsuccessful. This marked the first time in Stanley Cup play that a goalie was pulled for an extra attacker.

Playoff bracket

Quarterfinals

(C2) Toronto Maple Leafs vs. (A2) Chicago Black Hawks

(A3) New York Rangers vs. (C3) Montreal Maroons

Semifinals

(A1) Boston Bruins vs. (C1) Montreal Canadiens

(A2) Chicago Black Hawks vs. (A3) New York Rangers

Stanley Cup Finals

In the final series, the Chicago Black Hawks took an early two games to one lead in the newly expanded best-of-five Stanley Cup finals but the Montreal Canadiens came back and won the series three games to two for their second consecutive Stanley Cup win.

Awards
Howie Morenz won the Hart Trophy for the second time in his career. Frank Boucher won the Lady Byng for the fourth consecutive year. Roy Worters won the Vezina Trophy for the one and only time in his career.

All-Star teams
This was the first season that the NHL named its 'all-stars'. Although Roy Worters won the Vezina Trophy for "most valuable goaltender", Charlie Gardiner and Tiny Thompson were named to the all-star teams at the goaltender position.

Source: NHL.

Player statistics

Scoring leaders
GP = Games Played, G = Goals, A = Assists, Pts = Points, PIM = Penalties In Minutes

Source: NHL.

Leading goaltenders
Note: GP = Games played; Mins = Minutes played; GA = Goals against; SO = Shutouts; GAA = Goals against average

Source: NHL.

Coaches

American Division
Boston Bruins: Art Ross
Chicago Black Hawks: Emil Iverson
Detroit Falcons: Jack Adams
New York Rangers: Lester Patrick
Philadelphia Quakers:Cooper Smeaton

Canadian Division
Montreal Canadiens: Cecil Hart
Montreal Maroons: Dunc Munro and George Boucher
New York Americans: Eddie Gerard
Ottawa Senators: Newsy Lalonde and Dave Gill
Toronto Maple Leafs: Art Duncan

Debuts
The following is a list of players of note who played their first NHL game in 1930–31 (listed with their first team, asterisk(*) marks debut in playoffs):
Art Chapman, Boston Bruins
Doc Romnes, Chicago Black Hawks
John Sorrell, Detroit Falcons
Johnny Gagnon, Montreal Canadiens
Paul Haynes, Montreal Maroons
Dave Kerr, Montreal Maroons
Alex Levinsky, Toronto Maple Leafs
Bob Gracie, Toronto Maple Leafs

Last games
The following is a list of players of note that played their last game in the NHL in 1930–31 (listed with their last team):
Frank Fredrickson, Detroit Falcons
Bert McCaffrey, Montreal Canadiens
Joe Simpson, New York Americans
Babe Dye, Toronto Maple Leafs

See also
1930-31 NHL Transactions
List of Stanley Cup champions
1930 in sports
1931 in sports

References
 
 
 
 
 
 
 
 

Notes

External links
Hockey Database
NHL.com

 
1930–31 in Canadian ice hockey by league
1930–31 in American ice hockey by league